Renju (Japanese: 連珠) is a professional variant of gomoku. It was named renju by Japanese journalist Ruikou Kuroiwa (黒岩涙香) on December 6, 1899 in a Japanese newspaper Yorozu chouhou (萬朝報). The name "renju" means "connected pearls" in Japanese. The game is played with black and white stones on a 15×15 gridded go board.

The rule of renju weakens the advantages for the first player (Black) in gomoku by adding special restrictions for Black.

Rules

Opening rules
Unlike gomoku, renju has a unique sequence of opening moves called an "opening rule". There are several certified opening rules. The list of requirements for new opening rules as approved by the Renju International Federation (RIF) in 2003 was:

I. Traditions
 The basic renju rules must be kept.
 The opening stage must not exceed 5 moves.
 All 26 canonical openings must be possible and only 26 canonical openings can be possible.
 All present realistic variants must be possible.
 The moves located very closely near the edges of a board during the opening stage are not preferable.

II. Simplicity and attraction
 New rules must be simple to study.
 New rules must be simple to play for beginners. The situation when in significant part of cases a beginner will have the lost position already after the first 5 moves is not good.
 The rules must be systematic and attractive.

III. Creativity

 The number of possible creative variants must be significantly greater than now. These variants must be achieved under the optimal strategy of both players.
 The chances of sides to win must be practically equal.
 The situation when during the opening stage the player who make a move does not interested in the forming of equal and creative position is not preferable. (Example: indirect 2nd move in previous opening rules).
 The rules must give the chance for both players to avoid the position after the opening stage well known for the opponent.
 The knowledge of theory and deep own analyses must give an advantage but the player with a good imagination must have chances against this.

An example of such opening rule (namely "RIF opening rule") follows.
 The first player places 2 black stones and 1 white stone on the board thus forming opening pattern.
 The second player now chooses whether to play black or white.
 White then places one more stone on the board.
 Black places 2 stones on the board.
 White removes one of the two black stones from the previous move.
 White places a white stone.

After this sequence is complete, Black and White continue to take turns to place their stones.

The Extra General Assembly of Renju International Federation in 2008 created three new sets of rules for openings that are to replace the above old sequence of moves: Soosõrv, Taraguchi, and Yamaguchi. Also a rejection system for their use was approved.
The General Assembly of Renju International Federation in 2009 certified Sakata opening rule as proposed by Russia.
The General Assembly of Renju International Federation in 2011 certified modified opening rules such as Taraguchi-N and Soosõrv-N.

Forbidden moves
There are certain moves that Black is not allowed to make:
 Double three – Black cannot place a stone that builds two separate lines with three black stones in unbroken rows (i.e. rows not blocked by white stones).
 Double four – Black cannot place a stone that builds two separate lines with four black stones in a row.
 Overline – six or more black stones in a row.

Winning
Black can win the game only by placing five black stones in a row (vertically, horizontally or diagonally).

White can win by either:
 getting five (or more) white stones in a row
 forcing Black to make a forbidden move (see above).

Renju International Federation

The Renju International Federation (RIF) is an international organization which was founded in Stockholm, Sweden on August 8, 1988. The main purpose of the Renju International Federation is to unite all the renju and gomoku national federations all over the world, organize international tournaments and other activities in renju and gomoku, and spread renju activities in the world. The federation carry out the General Assembly every two years.

World Championships

There are several world championships organized by the Renju International Federation, including World Championship, Women World Championships, Team World Championships, Youth World Championships and Correspondence World Championships.

Renju World Championships have occurred every second year, since 1989. The opening rule was Yamaguchi from 2009 to 2015, and has been changed to Soosõrv-8 since 2017. The Women World Championships started in 1997 and are played every second year, at the same time and place with the World Championships.

Team World Championships in Renju have occurred every second year since 1996. From 2010 to 2016, the opening rule was played is Yamaguchi, and since 2018 the rule has been changed to Soosõrv-8.

World Championships in Renju via Correspondence were held in 1982 to 1993 (by paper letters, later by e-mails), and now are played every year since 1996 with an exception in 2009, 2010 and 2016.

Computers and renju
Free Renju was solved in 2001 as a win for the first player. However, renju with modern opening rules such as Yamaguchi and Soosõrv-N have not been solved.

The Renju World Computer Championship was started in 1991, and held for four times until 2004. From 2016, Renju was added to the Gomocup tournament, taking place every year, still active now.

The first program playing with human players in public competitions is Meijin-2000 developed by Oleg Stepanov, Russia. In 2000, Meijin-2000 played against human players in Moscow Open Tournament. However, not until 2017 were the computer programs proved to be able to outperform top human players in public competitions. In 2017, there was a match between the world champion program Yixin and the Taiwan's Meijin title holder Lin Shu-Hsuan, and Yixin won the match with 3-1. In 2018, there was a match between Yixin and the former world champion Qi Guan, and the match ended in a draw with 2.5-2.5.

See also
Gomoku
Renju International Federation
World Championships in Renju
Meijin (renju)
RIF rating list
Pente
Connect6
Go (board game)
Game complexity

References

Further reading
 Five-in-a-Row (Renju) For Beginners to Advanced Players 
 SOLVING RENJU by János Wágner and István Virág, ICGA Journal, 2001

External links
 Renju International Federation has complete rules and history of the game
 RenjuNews has news about Renju and Gomoku

 
Abstract strategy games
Traditional board games
Japanese games
Solved games
Games played on Go boards
sv:Luffarschack#Renju